Seven Summit Treks, is a commercial adventure operator, based in Kathmandu, Nepal.  They are specialized in Eight-thousander of Nepal, China, and Pakistan. Established by four Sherpa brothers including Mingma Sherpa, Chhang Dawa Sherpa, Tashi Lakpa Sherpa and Pasang Phurba Sherpa. Mingma and his brother Chhang Dawa are the first sibling to climbed all 8000ers, Mingma is first and Dawa is second South Asian to do so.

As of 2019, Seven Summit Treks (Est. 2010) is recognized and recorded as largest royalty/taxpayer firm of Nepal having organised the highest numbers of climbing expeditions over Nepal Himalayas. Seven Summit Treks gained popularity from managing logistic for number of pioneer and veteran climbers like Alex Txikon, Carlos Soria Fontán.

Associate Climbers
Kami Rita Sherpa - 24 Ascent of Mt. Everest
Sanu Sherpa - 14 Peak Climber
Shehroze Kashif - A Pakistani climber, titled for Youngest to Climb Everest and K2 (Combo) & Youngest Male to climb K2. 
Lakpa Dendi Sherpa - Lakpa Dendi also holds the Guinness World Record title of "Fastest to Climb Mt. Everest Thrice - Nepal Side" as he climbed the world's highest peak three times from the basecamp to the summit on 13, 18 and 24 May 2018 in a single season with in 11 Days.
Sona Sherpa - A Nepalese Sherpa, climbed several eight thousand meters peak including Mt. K2 in winter.

Notable Expeditions
 K2 Winter Expedition 2020/21: Ten climbers from an international expedition made the first winter summit on 16 January 2021.

References

Mount Everest
Sherpa people
Eight-thousanders